Halže is a municipality and village in Tachov District in the Plzeň Region of the Czech Republic. It has about 1,000 inhabitants.

Administrative parts
Villages of Branka, Horní Výšina and Svobodka are administrative parts of Halže.

Geography
The municipality lies on the border with Germany and is adjacent to German municipalities of Bärnau and Mähring. It lies in the Upper Palatine Forest mountain range. The Mže River flows through the municipality. On the southern municipal border there is the Lučina Reservoir.

History

The first written mention of Halže is from 1479. It was a part of the Tachov estate until 1644, when the village was donated to the newly established monastery in Světce. Halže was owned by the monastery until 1787, when the monastery was abolished, then it became a separate manor. It the 1880s, it was acquired by the Landwehr of Wehrheim family, who owned it until 1945.

In 1945, most German-speaking inhabitants, which made majority of the population in Halže, were expelled. After the war the municipality was only partly repopulated.

Sights
The Church of Saints John and Paul was built in the late Baroque style in 1799–1801. The Empire style tower was added in 1855.

References

External links

 

Villages in Tachov District